The intermediate dorsal cutaneous nerve (external dorsal cutaneous branch), the smaller, passes along the lateral part of the dorsum of the foot, and divides into dorsal digital branches, which supply the contiguous sides of the third and fourth, and of the fourth and fifth toes.

It also supplies the skin of the lateral side of the foot and ankle, and communicates with the sural nerve.

The branches of the superficial peroneal nerve supply the skin of the dorsal surfaces of all the toes excepting the lateral side of the little toe, and the adjoining sides of the great and second toes, the former being supplied by the lateral dorsal cutaneous nerve from the sural nerve, and the latter by the medial branch of the deep peroneal nerve.

Frequently some of the lateral branches of the superficial peroneal are absent, and their places are then taken by branches of the sural nerve.

References 

Nerves of the lower limb and lower torso